The 2010 FIM Toruń Speedway Grand Prix of Poland was the fifth race of the 2010 Speedway Grand Prix season. It took place on 19 June at the MotoArena Toruń in Toruń, Poland.

The Polish Grand Prix, first hosted in Toruń, was won by Pole Tomasz Gollob, who beat Poles Rune Holta and Jarosław Hampel and Jason Crump of Australia. It was first time in SGP history, when podium was won by riders from the same country.

Riders 
The Speedway Grand Prix Commission nominated Adrian Miedziński as Wild Card, and Artur Mroczka and Maciej Janowski both as Track Reserves. Injured Emil Sayfutdinov will be replaced by first Qualified Substitutes Piotr Protasiewicz again. The Draw was made on June 18 at 13:00 CEST by Michał Zalewski, President (=Mayor) of Toruń.
 (3)  Emil Sayfutdinov → (19)  Piotr Protasiewicz

Hans N. Andersen, Chris Holder and Adrian Miedziński is all riding for Unibax Toruń, whose home track is at the Motoarena, in the 2010 season in Poland.

Heat details

Heat after heat 
 Holta, Miedziński, Lindgren, Bjerre
 Gollob, Hancock, Andersen, Pedersen (Fx)
 Hampel, Harris, Holder, Protasiewicz
 Crump, Woffinden, Zetterström, Jonsson
 Gollob, Crump, Miedziński, Protasiewicz
 Holta, Andersen, Harris, Zetterström
 Bjerre, Holder, Pedersen, Woffinden
 Hampel, Lindgren, Hancock, Jonsson
 Holder, Andersen, Jonsson, Miedziński
 Gollob, Holta, Hampel, Woffinden
 Zetterström, Hancock, Bjerre, Protasiewicz
 Crump, Pedersen, Lindgren, Harris
 Hampel, Pedersen, Zetterström, Miedziński (Fx)
 Holta, Crump, Hancock, Holder (Fx)
 Gollob, Jonsson, Harris, Bjerre
 Woffinden, Protasiewicz, Andersen, Lindgren
 Miedziński, Woffinden, Harris, Hancock
 Protasiewicz, Pedersen, Holta, Jonsson
 Crump, Andersen, Hampel, Bjerre
 Gollob, Lindgren, Zetterström, Mroczka (Fx)
 Semi-Finals:
 Gollob, Hampel, Pedersen, Woffinden
 Holta, Crump, Andersen, Miedziński
 the Final:
 Gollob, Holta, Hampel, Crump

The intermediate classification

See also 
 motorcycle speedway

References 

Poland
2010
Sport in Toruń